Thomas "Tom" E. Flaherty (born 1950) is an American cellist, composer, and musicologist. He is the John P. and Magdalena R. Dexter Professor of Music at Pomona College in Claremont, California.

References

External links
Faculty page at Pomona College

Living people
Pomona College faculty
American musicologists
American cellists
American composers
1950 births